The 1987 National Junior Mechanics Competition (NJMC) (formerly the Apprentice Competition) event for the Road Transport Industry Training Board (RTITB) National Mechanics Competition was held on 24 June 1987 at MOTEC 1 (Multi Occupational Training and Educational Centre) located at High Ercall, a former RAF base.

The RTITB's Chairman, John Armstrong, revealed that 230 teams entered 1987's National Junior Mechanics Competition (NJMC).  After regional heats, quarter-finals and semi-finals the final day consisted of a morning practical round contested by 10 teams, only 4 teams qualified for the final round.

The team from Soundwell Technical College, Bristol, England won the competition for the 4th time, having last been victorious in 1981.  Carlisle College were placed 2nd, after leading in the practical round.

Highlights of the final were shown on Central Television news.

Austin Rover's UK Services Director, Roy Davies, presented the Winner's shield to Soundwell's Team Captain Mark Mannion.

Semi Final (Practical Round) Results

Final Results

Previous Winners

Future achievements of the 1987 Contestants

Mark ‘Cutty’ Cutmore, the Captain of third placed South Devon College pursued a career in the Royal Air Force, after his apprenticeship as a Mechanic.  After graduating from the Royal Air Force’s Initial Officer Training, Cutty trained as a pilot and was selected to fly the Jaguar aircraft. Based in Scotland, Cutty trained as an Electronic Warfare Instructor, seeing active service over ex-Yugoslavia. He also represented the Royal Air Force as the Jaguar Display Pilot.  Cutty joined the Red Arrows in 1999, flying as Reds 3, 5 and 9.  After leaving the Red Arrows, Cutty was responsible for Jaguar Force training, later returning to the front line as a Flight Commander.  After leaving the Royal Air Force Cutty joined The Blades display team as Blade 4, retiring after 10 display seasons in December 2017.

Justin Ellis, Captain of the runners-up Carlisle College, worked his way up through the ranks, starting as an apprentice right through to Service Manager at a Suzuki and Jeep Dealership in Carlisle. Whilst at Suzuki, Justin won the prestigious Suzuki Technician of the Year award in 2000. Justin also qualified as a Suzuki Master Technician and Jeep Master Diagnostic Technician. He later specialised in 4x4 vehicles, with particular interest in Chrysler, Suzuki, Jeep and Kia brands.  In 2008 Justin founded City Garage, Tyne Street, Carlisle in 2008.

Ian Headford of Soundwell College left the automotive industry to follow a career in computing.  Ian developed the popular Outlook Connector for MDaemon application for Interconnect Direct Limited an IT Software company.

Mark Mannion, Captain of the winners Soundwell College, left the automotive industry to pursue a career in IT.  In 2007 Mark became Managing Director and co-founder of Extra Technology, an Automation Consultancy company.

Paul "Moff the Mullchanic" Moffat of Carlisle College is now a renowned Motorcycle Mechanic.  Paul received factory training in Aprilia, Kawasaki, Ducati and was one of Yamaha’s Omega technicians.  His forte is classic British and Japanese motorcycles.

Bruce Unrau of Stevenson College became a senior member of the Caledonian Brewery production team.

Future of the RTITB

The Road Transport Industry Training Board was hit by scandal in 1997 and lost the right to issue TEC (A-level equivalent) certificates.  The NJMC competition did not continue after 1997.

.

References

Bibliography

Competitions
Motor vehicle maintenance
1987 in the United Kingdom